Jacolby Satterwhite (born 1986 in Columbia, South Carolina) is an American contemporary artist recognized for fusing performance, digital animation, and personal ephemera to create immersive installations and related work referencing art history, "expanded cinema," and the pop-cultural worlds of American music videos, social media, and video games. He has exhibited work at the Minneapolis Institute of Art, the Museum of Contemporary Art, Chicago, Louis Vuitton Foundation in Paris, the New Museum and the Museum of Modern Art, both in New York City, and the Institute of Contemporary Art, Philadelphia. In addition to MoMA, his work is in the public collections of the Studio Museum in Harlem, the Seattle Art Museum, the Whitney Museum of American Art, the Kiasma, and the San Jose Museum of Art. Satterwhite has also served as a contributing director for the music video that accompanied Solange's 2019 visual album When I Get Home and directed a short film accompaniment to Perfume Genius's 2022 studio album Ugly Season.

Based in Brooklyn, Satterwhite's was featured in the featured in the 2014 Whitney Biennial at the Whitney Museum of American Art and in 2016 he was awarded the United States Artist Francie Bishop Good & David Horvitz Fellowship.

Early life and education 
Satterwhite was born in Columbia, South Carolina. As a child, he would watch Janet Jackson's video anthology VHS tape everyday after school. Music videos by Deee Lite, Björk, Jackson, Chemical Brothers, Prodigy, Michael Jackson and Madonna also influenced his aesthetic. He began working with technology at the age of 11 when he got his first personal computer; prior to that he owned consoles from Game Gear, Sega Genesis, SNES, 32X, Nintendo 64, Sega Saturn, and Sony PlayStation. Satterwhite also attended the state Governor's School.

Satterwhite received his BFA from Maryland Institute College of Art in 2008 and he attended the Skowhegan School of Painting and Sculpture the next year. He received an MFA from the University of Pennsylvania in 2010.

Career 
Satterwhite's work often utilizes his mother's schematic drawings/inventions of ordinary objects influenced by consumer culture, medicine, fashion, Surrealism, mathematics, sex, philosophy, astrology, and matrilineal concerns. Patricia Satterwhite, who died in 2016, was diagnosed with schizophrenia and was a prolific drawer.

In 2012 Satterwhite presented an exhibition entitled Jacolby Satterwhite at the Hudson D. Walker Gallery in Provincetown, Massachusetts. The next year, the exhibition Island of Treasure at Mallorca Landings in Palma De Mallorca, Spain, included the Reifying Desire video series (2011-14), which was in turn included in the 2014 Whitney Biennial. The series combined 3D animation and live action, the work explores themes of memory and personal history in a virtual dreamlike environment. In an interview from late 2014, Satterwhite describes how his broader creative approach informed Reifying Desire:My work is about observation in general. I'm interested in the potential of what observation can do when synthesized unnaturally. How can you bring together personal, private, and public? How can you bring together drawing, performance, animation, painting, and sculpture and weave them into a uniform space and make sense out of it? That's why I called the series [in the Whitney Biennial] Reifying Desire. I was interested in how one person could concretize abstraction, because reification is about concretizing abstraction. It's about making something unnatural and indefinable concrete. The whole oxymoron is that I never achieve specificity in my work, ever. It never concretizes; it just gets more abstract.Satterwhite has also shown/performed in group exhibitions including at MoMA PS1, the Smithsonian, The Kitchen, Rush Arts Gallery, and Exit Art. 

Satterwhite exhibited works in the Matriarch's Rhapsody in exhibitions in Triforce at the Bindery Projects in Minneapolis, Minnesota. The same year he exhibited works from the Matriarch's Rhapsody in exhibitions including his first solo show in New York, The Matriarch's Rhapsody, Monya Rowe Gallery, in January, The House of Patricia, Satterwhite at the Mallorca Landings Gallery in Palme De Mallorca in February, and Grey Lines at Recess in New York City in August.

In 2014 he showed work in the exhibition "WPA Hothouse Video: Jacolby Satterwhite," curated by Julie Chae at the Capitol Skyline Hotel. Chae described Satterwhite's work as "visually spectacular, strange, and boldly combines humor with darker elements". The exhibition included the work Country Ball, which is in the public collection of the Seattle Art Museum. In the same year, he had an exhibition at OhWOW Gallery (now Morán Morán) in Los Angeles, titled How Lovely Is Me Being As I Am, the title of which he attributed to his mother's unique use of language.

In 2015 and 2016, Satterwhite was part of the traveling exhibition Disguise: Masks and Global African Art, a collaboration between the Seattle Art Museum (on display from June 18 to September 7, 2015 in Seattle) and from April 29 to September 18, 2016 at the Brooklyn Museum. The exhibition focused on African masquerade and the power of the mask and costume as a proactive and playful way to engage about current social problems centering around class, gender, and issues of power and to give insight into the future. The exhibition presented contemporary and historical works from the Seattle Art Museum that worked in dialogue and ranged in mediums from video installation to photography and sculpture.

In 2018, Satterwhite had a solo exhibition at New York’s Gavin Brown’s enterprise which featured the music video for his concept album, Blessed Avenue, based on the parts of songs his late mother recorded on cassettes. The next year he served as a contributing director for the music video that accompanied Solange's 2019 visual album When I Get Home. His work accompanied Solange's song "Sound of Rain."

That same year, Satterwhite had his first solo museum exhibition at The Fabric Workshop and Museum in Philadelphia, titled, "Jacolby Satterwhite: Room for Living," curated by curated by Karen Patterson, after a two-year residency there. Bruce Nauman, Carvaggio, and Final Fantasy were some of the influences he cited in the work. The watertub and the handwriting around one element of the exhibition were designed by Satterwhite’s late mother, Patricia. The show was reviewed in the New York Observer and Hyperallergic. Satterwhite opened a second solo show, “You’re at home,” at Brooklyn’s Pioneer Works on October 4. The work was formed around a concept album originally commissioned by the San Francisco Museum of Modern Art which used songs his mother recorded into a tape recorder. Together with guest musicians, such as experimental pop artist Lafawndah and cellist Patrick Belaga, Satterwhite and Teengirl Fantasy’s Nick Weiss expanded Patricia Satterwhite's original a cappella recordings from the 1990s into happy and melancholic pop songs. "It takes a low-fi form of expression–folk music recorded onto cassette tapes at home in the 1990s–and elevates it all the way to a 3D animated virtual reality, experimental performance piece and concept album," he told Frieze magazine's Michael Bullock.

Satterwhite directed Pygmalion's Ugly Season, a short film accompaniment to Perfume Genius's 2022 studio album Ugly Season.

Honors and awards 
2016 United States Artists Fellowship
2013 Louis Comfort Tiffany Grant
2013 Arts Matters Grant
2013-14 Lower Manhattan Cultural Council Workspace Artist-in-Residence
2013 Recess Art, Sessions Residency
2012-13 Fine Arts Work Center Fellowship 2nd Year
2012 Headlands Center for the Arts - Artist in Residence
2011-12 Fine Arts Work Center Fellowship 1st Year
2011 Electronic Television Center Finishing Funds Grant
2011 Center for Photography, Woodstock
2011 Van Lier Grant, Jamaica Center for Arts and Learning, Studio LLC program
2011 Queer|Art|Mentorship Fellowship
2010-11 Harvestworks Artist In Residence, New York, NY
2010 Toby Devan Lewis Fellowship
2009 Cosby Fellowship to Skowhegan School for Painting and Sculpture
2007 Grand Prize Winner for Driven exhibition at the Smithsonian Institution's S. Dillon Ripley Center

Collections 
 Museum of Contemporary Art Kiasma, Helsinki
 Museum of Modern Art, New York
 Studio Museum in Harlem, New York
 The Whitney Museum of American Art, New York
 Seattle Art Museum
 San Jose Museum of Art

References

External links 
https://web.archive.org/web/20150507101411/http://whitney.org/Exhibitions/2014Biennial/JacolbySatterwhite
http://rhizome.org/editorial/2014/jan/9/artist-profile-jacolby-satterwhite/
Satterwhite's Vimeo account

1986 births
Living people
People from Columbia, South Carolina
Maryland Institute College of Art alumni
University of Pennsylvania School of Design alumni
American printmakers
Animators from South Carolina
American performance artists
American video artists
African-American printmakers
21st-century African-American people
20th-century African-American people
African-American contemporary artists
American contemporary artists